Villaromagnano is a comune (municipality) in the Province of Alessandria in the Italian region Piedmont, located about  southeast of Turin and about  southeast of Alessandria.

Villaromagnano borders the following municipalities: Carbonara Scrivia, Cerreto Grue, Costa Vescovato, Paderna, Sarezzano, Spineto Scrivia, and Tortona.

References

Cities and towns in Piedmont